The Islamic State – Khorasan Province (ISIS-K) is an affiliate of the Islamic State militant group active in South Asia and Central Asia. Some media sources also use the terms ISK (or IS–K), ISISK (or ISIS–K), ISKP (or IS–KP), Daesh–Khorasan or Daesh–K in referring to the group. ISIS-K has been active in Afghanistan, Pakistan, Tajikistan, and Uzbekistan, where they claimed attacks. The ISIS-K and Taliban consider each other enemies.

The group was created in January 2015 by disaffected Taliban in eastern Afghanistan, although its membership includes individuals from various countries, notably Pakistan, Bangladesh, India, and Myanmar. Its initial leaders, Hafiz Saeed Khan and Abdul Rauf Aliza, were killed by US forces in July 2016 and February 2015, respectively. Subsequent leaders have also been killed; its leader Abdullah Orokzai was captured in April 2020 by Afghanistan's former intelligence service, the National Directorate of Security.

ISIS-K has conducted numerous high-profile attacks against civilians, primarily in Afghanistan and Pakistan. In July 2018, ISIS-K bombings killed 149 in Mastung, Pakistan. In May 2021, an ISIS-K bombing killed 90 in Kabul. In August 2021, ISIS-K killed 13 American military personnel and at least 169 Afghans during the U.S. evacuation of Kabul, which marked the highest number of U.S. military deaths in an attack in Afghanistan since 2011.

Background
Around September 2014, IS sent representatives to Pakistan to meet with local militants including some Tehrik-i-Taliban Pakistan (TTP) factions, following months of discussions. At the same time, leaflets, flags and propaganda materials in support of IS began being distributed in parts of Pakistan, including a pamphlet written in Pashto and Dari that called on all Muslims to swear allegiance to Abu Bakr al-Baghdadi. The leaflets were believed to have been produced and distributed from across the border in Afghanistan. In October 2014, former Taliban commander Abdul Rauf Khadim visited Iraq, later returning to Afghanistan where he recruited followers in Helmand and Farah provinces. In the same month, six TTP commanders; Hafiz Khan Saeed, official spokesman Shahidullah Shahid, and the TTP commanders of Kurram and Khyber tribal regions and Peshawar and Hangu Districts, publicly defected from the TTP and pledged allegiance to Abu Bakr al-Baghdadi.

On 10 January 2015, these six individuals appeared in a video where they again pledged allegiance to al-Baghdadi and nominated Hafiz Saeed Khan as the leader of their group. They were joined by other mid-level militant commanders including representatives from Afghanistan's Logar and Kunar Province and Pakistan's Lakki Marwat. Shahidullah Shahid claimed that other jihadists from both countries supported the pledge of allegiance (bay'ah) but had been unable to attend the meeting in person. The newly formed group was later joined by the members of Islamic Movement of Uzbekistan and other Central Asian militants.

Since 2017, ISIS-K has been responsible for about 250 clashes with U.S. troops and Afghan and Pakistani security forces.

Goal

As a "province" (wilayah) of the core Islamic State, the group aims to establish control of Central Asia and South Asia under the Khorasan Province banner of the self-declared caliphate. A map published by IS propaganda shows the Khorasan area stretching from Kazakhstan in the north to Sri Lanka and the Maldives in the south, and from eastern Iran in the west to western China in the east.

History

On 26 January 2015, IS's official spokesman Abu Muhammad al-Adnani released an audio statement in which he accepted the earlier pledge of allegiance and announced the expansion of IS's caliphate with the creation of Wilayat Khorasan (Khorasan Province), a historical region incorporating parts of Afghanistan and Pakistan. Hafiz Khan Saeed was appointed as its local leader or Wāli (Governor). Abdul Rauf was named as Khan's deputy and was killed by a US drone strike in Afghanistan some weeks later.

IS began actively recruiting defectors from the Taliban in particular among those who were disgruntled with their leaders or lack of battlefield success. This prompted senior Taliban leader Akhtar Mansour to write a letter addressed to Abu Bakr al-Baghdadi, asking for the recruitment in Afghanistan to stop and arguing that the war in Afghanistan should be under the Taliban leadership. Nevertheless, fighting between the two groups broke out in Nangarhar Province and by June 2015 IS had been able to seize territory in Afghanistan for the first time. After driving the Taliban out of certain districts of Nangarhar after months of clashes, the group started carrying out its first attacks against Afghan forces in the province. Khorasan Province also developed a presence in other provinces including Helmand and Farah. In 2015, IS began broadcasting Pashto language radio in Nangarhar Province, later on adding content in Dari.

The group was boosted in August 2015 when the Afghanistan-based militant group, the Islamic Movement of Uzbekistan (IMU), pledged allegiance to IS and declared that it was a member of Wilayah Khorasan. Clashes broke out between IMU and the Taliban in Zabul Province following this pledge. The Taliban launched an offensive causing casualties. The Taliban succeeded in dislodging IS from Farah province over the same period.

In 2016, the group lost control of the majority of its territory in Nangarhar province. It was driven out of Achin and Shinwar Districts following a military operation by Afghan Security Forces while clashes with the Taliban led to it being driven out of Batikot and Chaparhar districts. Following the loosening of targeting restrictions by US Forces in Afghanistan earlier in the year, the US Air Force began conducting scores of air strikes against IS targets. In April 2016, the Taliban reported that a number of senior and mid-level leaders of Wilayah Khorasan in Nangarhar Province had defected from IS and pledged allegiance to Taliban leader Akhtar Mansour. The defectors included members of the group's central council, judicial council and prisoners council as well as certain field commanders and fighters.

A stronghold in eastern Afghanistan also collapsed as a result of concerted military offensives from United States, Afghan forces and Taliban. On 25 December 2017, in a video of a Kashmiri militant declaring allegiance to the Islamic State and declaring an ISIS-K Province in Kashmir, the fighter called on Ansar Ghazwat-ul-Hind to ally with or give allegiance to IS and wage jihad in Kashmir against the Indian government but the group declined.

On 24 January 2018, militants launched a bomb and gun attack on a Save the Children office in Jalalabad, killing six people and injuring 27. ISIS-K claimed responsibility, saying it was targeting Western institutions. In the aftermath of the attack, Save the Children suspended its operations in Afghanistan.

On 15 May 2019, ISIS declared new 'Pakistan Province' and 'India Province' branches after claiming attacks in Balochistan and Kashmir respectively. This suggests that while the Khorasan Province still exists, its self-proclaimed geographical area may be reduced.

On 17 August 2019, a suicide bombing took place during a wedding in a wedding hall in Kabul. At least 92 people were killed in the attack and over 140 injured. ISIS-K claimed responsibility for the bombing, stating that the attack targeted the Shi'ites.

On 4 April 2020, the National Directorate of Security announced the arrest of the head of IS Aslam Farooqi by the Afghan military forces who took him into custody along with 20 other commanders.

On 12 May 2020, a hospital's maternity ward in Kabul and a funeral in Kuz Kunar were attacked, resulting in the deaths of 56 people and injuries of 148 others, including newborn babies, mothers, nurses, and mourners. The U.S. government said that ISIS-K conducted the May 2020 Afghanistan attacks, not the Taliban, but this assertion was rejected by Afghan government.

By May 2020 IS-KP territorial control in Afghanistan was reportedly limited to parts of Chawkay District in Kunar province, specifically Chalas village, Dewaygal Valley and Shuraz Valley.

On 26 July 2020, a United Nations report stated that even though the IS branch in Afghanistan had undergone further severe reverses in its former Afghan strongholds of Nangarhar and Kunar provinces, it was too soon to discount it as a threat and although in territorial retreat, IS in Afghanistan remains capable of carrying out high-profile attacks in various parts of the country, including Kabul, it added.

On 24 October 2020, a suicide bombing killed at least 30 people and another 70 were injured outside an educational center in Kabul. The ISIS-K claimed responsibility for the attack.

On 2 November 2020, more than 32 people were killed and 50 others injured in an attack on Kabul University. The ISIS-K claimed responsibility for the attack.

In March 2021, three female media workers were shot dead in Jalalabad. The ISIS-K claimed responsibility for the attack.

On 8 May 2021, a car bombing, followed by two more improvised explosive device (IED) blasts, occurred in front of Sayed al-Shuhada school in Dashte Barchi, a predominantly Shia neighborhood of western Kabul, leaving at least 90 people dead and 240 injured.  The majority of the casualties were girls between 11 and 15 years old. The attack took place in a neighborhood that has frequently been attacked by militants belonging to the regional ISIS-K over the years. Taliban spokesman condemned the attack and held ISIS-K responsible for the attack.

On 15 May 2021, a bomb exploded inside a Kabul mosque as worshippers gathered for the Muslim festival of Eid al-Fitr, killing at least 12 people and injuring another 15. The ISIS-K claimed responsibility for the attack.

On 26 August 2021, an ISIS-K suicide bomber attacked Hamid Karzai International Airport in Kabul, killing over 170 people, including 28 Taliban members and 13 US military personnel. Amidst the Taliban advance on Kabul in preceding weeks, hundreds to thousands of ISIS-K prisoners had been released or otherwise escaped from detention, leading to U.S. fears of attacks on the airport and future targets. After the attack, the Taliban announced that they would curtail the operations of ISIS-K and capture its leader Shahab al-Muhajir.

In October 2021, US sanctioned a man named Ismatullah Khalozai, because he transferred funds to ISIS-K from his Turkey based business for over two years. He was also accused of using a United Arab Emirates based financing scheme to fund the ISIS-K before and for human trafficking and helping mercenaries.

On 6 September 2022, the Human Rights Watch reported that since the Taliban took over Afghanistan in August 2021, the ISIS-K has claimed responsibility for 13 attacks against Hazaras and has been linked to at least 3 more, killing and injuring at least 700 people. The Islamic State affiliate has repeatedly attacked Hazaras and other religious minorities at mosques, schools, and workplaces.

Claimed and alleged attacks

Operations by opponents
2017 Nangarhar airstrike

On 13 April 2017, a GBU43/B MOAB was dropped in an airstrike on a cave complex in Achin District, Nangarhar Province, Afghanistan. It was the first use of the bomb on the battlefield. The Afghan defence ministry reported it to have killed over 36 militants and destroyed the tunnel complex including a cache of weapons. No civilian casualties were reported.

On 14 April 2017, Pakistan's security agencies along with the local police raided a house in Lahore's Factory Area as part of their combing operation which was approved by Pakistan's Chief of Army Staff Qamar Javed Bajwa in the aftermath of Mall Road bombing. After an exchange of fire which killed one "terrorist", three other suspects were arrested, one of them being Noreen Leghari, a student from Hyderabad, Pakistan who was claimed to be missing by her family 4 days prior to the raid. On a confessional statement released by ISPR, Noreen confessed to joining IS through a terrorist she met on social media, She also told authorities that she was recruited by IS to attack a church in Lahore on the Easter Sunday, two suicide jackets, four hand grenades and bullets were provided to them. On 4 September 2019, in a joint operation of Counter Terrorism Department,  FIA and Balochistan Constabulary at least 6 ISIS militants were killed in an intelligence-based operation in Quetta's Eastern Bypass area. During the operation, one official of the Balochistan Constabulary was killed and eight others from the Counter Terrorism Department were injured.

Mohmand Valley Raid

On 26 April 2017, a joint raid operation committed by U.S. Army Rangers and Afghan Special Forces in the Nangarhar Province resulted in the death of Sheikh Abdul Hasib, the leader of IS in Afghanistan. Along with Hasib, a number of other commanders of IS were killed according to a statement by the U.S. Military. Two U.S. soldiers died during the operation, possibly due to friendly fire. On 1 January 2019, Afghan Special Forces attacked ISIS–K in Nangarhar Province's Achin District, killing 27 militants according to officials. Two local ISIS leaders, Sediq Yar and Syed Omar, were reported to be among those killed. On 10 January, senior ISIS–K commander Khetab Emir was also killed in a raid in Nangarhar according to a U.S. forces spokesman. Emir was reported to have facilitated major attacks and provided ISIS–K bombmakers with explosive materials. On 30 April 2019, Afghan government forces undertook clearing operations directed against both ISIS–K and the Taliban in eastern Nangarhar Province after the two groups fought for over a week over a group of villages in an area of illegal talc mining. The National Directorate of Security claimed 22 ISIS–K fighters were killed and two weapons caches destroyed while the Taliban claimed US-backed Afghan forces killed seven civilians; a provincial official said over 9,000 families had been displaced by the fighting. On 21 August 2019, an airstrike killed six militants of IS in Nangarhar province including two Pakistani nationals.

Taliban operations

In July 2018, the Taliban launched an offensive against IS in the Jowzjan province.

2021 U.S. airstrikes
On 27 August 2021, the United States launched an airstrike against three suspected ISIS-K members in Nangarhar Province. On 29 August, a drone attack against a suspected Islamic State bomber in Kabul killed a family of 9, including 6 children.

Analysis
US General Sean Swindell told the BBC in June 2015 that members of Khorasan Province were in contact with ISIL's central leadership in Syria although the exact relationship between the two is unclear. ISIS-K remained the top terrorist threat, claiming responsibility for 41 terrorist attacks, including the 4 March 2022 bombing at a Shia mosque in Pakistan that killed 63 and wounded 200.  ISIS-K has approximately 2,000 members in Afghanistan, and its attacks have focused on the Taliban, religious minorities, and economic infrastructure.

Relationship with the Taliban 
Since the Taliban took control of the Afghan central government following the United States withdrawal and collapse of the Afghan National Army (ANA) in August 2021, the Taliban has been locked in a violent counterinsurgency struggle against ISIS-K. The Taliban-led Islamic Emirate of Afghanistan has sought international legitimacy by demonstrating its efforts to curb terrorism and secure national sovereignty over Afghan territory, namely for prospects of international investment to reverse Afghanistan's increasing poverty. ISIS-K, seeking to establish the Khorasan Province of a greater Islamic State on Afghan territory, principally seeks to undermine the so called 'apostate' and 'Western puppet' Taliban regime in hopes of once again regaining control of Afghan territory. Beginning in late 2022 and continuing through 2023, ISIS-K has launched attacks on diplomats from the People's Republic of China and Islamic Republic of Pakistan, nations with warmer relations towards the Taliban, aiming to deter foreign recognition, investment, or support to the Taliban government through violent attacks exhibiting Taliban failures to provide security.

Membership
According to a UN report, up to 70 IS fighters arrived from Iraq and Syria to form the initial core of the group in Afghanistan. Most of the group's membership growth has come from recruiting Afghan defectors from the Taliban. In Afghanistan, IS has not only been recruiting from the villages but also the urban middle class and specifically targeting the universities as there have been cases of lecturers in Islamic law as well as students at Kabul University pledging allegiance to the group.

Foreign fighters from Pakistan and Uzbekistan are also known to be part of the group. Other foreign fighters have included Indians, with 14 Keralites having been freed by the Taliban from prison following the fall of Kabul. The Taliban also claimed that two Malaysians of ISIS-K were caught by them following a gun battle in Kabul on August 26, 2021. Individuals from Myanmar and Bangladesh have also been part of it, and one known Bangladeshi national of ISIS-K was arrested by the Afghan intelligence in 2020.

After the takeover of Kabul by the Taliban in 2021, several members of Afghan intelligence agency and Afghan National Army have also joined the Islamic State – Khorasan Province.

Foothold and strategy
While the group has managed to establish a foothold in Afghanistan, it has largely carried out isolated, smaller-scale attacks in Pakistan. The group has also failed to establish a foothold in Pakistan because of anti-terrorism operations conducted by Pakistan's law enforcement agencies against the group. A series of successful operations by US, Afghan and coalition forces in Afghanistan against the group also crippled group's ability to operate in the region.

Designation as a terrorist organization

References

External links
 Frontline: ISIS in Afghanistan (November 2015), documentary by PBS

Factions of the Islamic State of Iraq and the Levant
Islamic State of Iraq and the Levant in Afghanistan
Islamic State of Iraq and the Levant and Pakistan
Islamic terrorism in India
Jihadist groups in Afghanistan
Jihadist groups in Bangladesh
Jihadist groups in Jammu and Kashmir
Jihadist groups in Pakistan
Terrorism in Afghanistan
Terrorism in Pakistan
Organizations based in Asia designated as terrorist
Organizations designated as terrorist by Argentina
Organisations designated as terrorist by Australia
Organizations designated as terrorist by Canada
Organizations designated as terrorist by Iraq
Organizations designated as terrorist by the United States
Organisations designated as terrorist by India
Organisations designated as terrorist by New Zealand
Rebel groups in Afghanistan
Rebel groups in India
Rebel groups in Pakistan
Salafi Jihadist groups